Circle of Nations Wahpeton Indian School, formerly Wahpeton Indian School, is a tribally-controlled grade 4-8 school in Wahpeton, North Dakota.

It is affiliated with the Bureau of Indian Education (BIE). It is not on an Indian reservation.

History
The United States Congress passed a law establishing the school in 1904, with Porter James McCumber of North Dakota championing the law. President of the United States Theodore Roosevelt signed the act into law. The school began taking students in 1908. Its first classes were held in February, and it was controlled by the Bureau of Indian Affairs (BIA).

The school previously used harsh discipline that was used in various Indian boarding schools in the United States. In 1929, area businesspersons investigated the school after receiving reports of starvation. In  1947 the BIA initially was to close the school, but instead kept it open with reduced enrollment.

There were plans to close the school in 1985.

In 1992 U.S. House member Byron Dorgan received reports from a counselor at Wahpeton related to abuse, and Dorgan reported them to the BIA. By 1993 the federal and North Dakota governments investigated matters at the school.

In June 1993 it became a tribally controlled school as the Wahpeton Indian School Board, Incorporated assumed ownership of the school, and from that point forward the Bureau of Indian Education (BIE) began providing grants. The school received its current name in 1994.

In 1994 the BIA released a report regarding conditions at the school. Kent Conrad, a U.S. Senator from the state, dismissed it, calling it "a sham and a whitewash."

By the 1990s the people overseeing the school were formerly students in the boarding school and created a regime that prohibited verbal or physical abuse.

In 2018 Tanner Rabbithead became the CEO and Trevor Gourneau became the principal.

Student body
Its students originate from 18 states, with 33 tribes represented.

 many of the students come from situations with food insecurity and/or school absenteeism. In some cases families with domestic problems send their children to Wahpeton so that when the situations are resolved, the children may return and the family may save face, versus the loss of reputation and permanency from foster care.

See also
 Off-reservation boarding schools operated by the BIE
 Chemawa Indian School
 Flandreau Indian School
 Riverside Indian School
 Sherman Indian High School
 Off-reservation boarding schools operated by tribes
 Pierre Indian Learning Center
 Sequoyah Schools
 Sisseton Wahpeton Oyate

References
 - PDF, Alternate link

Notes

Further reading

External links
 Circle of Nations Wahpeton Indian School

Public middle schools in North Dakota
Public boarding schools in the United States
Boarding schools in North Dakota
Native American boarding schools
1904 establishments in North Dakota
Educational institutions established in 1904
Education in Richland County, North Dakota
Native American history of North Dakota
Wahpeton, North Dakota